Black as Night is a 2021 American horror film written by Sherman Payne and directed by Maritte Lee Go. It stars Asjha Cooper, Frabizio Guido, Mason Beauchamp, Abbie Gayle, Craig Tate and Keith David. The film is the sixth installment in the anthological Welcome to the Blumhouse film series.

Plot

A teenage girl with self-esteem issues, Shawna, finds confidence in the most unlikely way, by spending her summer battling vampires that prey on New Orleans' disenfranchised with the help of her best friend, Pedro, the boy she's always pined for, Chris, and a peculiar rich girl, Granya.

Cast

 Asjha Cooper as Shawna
 Frabizio Guido as Pedro
 Mason Beauchamp as Chris
 Abbie Gayle as Granya
 Craig Tate as LeFrak
 Keith David as Babineaux

Release
The film was released in the United States on October 1, 2021, by Amazon Studios.

Reception
On review aggregator website Rotten Tomatoes, the film holds an approval rating of 70% based on 33 reviews, with an average rating of 6.20/10. The website's critical consensus reads: "It may not be particularly scary, but Black as Night has just enough bite to satisfy audiences in the mood for dark, teen-focused supernatural drama. On Metacritic, the film has an weighted average score of 53 out of 100 based on 7 critics indicating "mixed or average reviews".

Denis Harvey of Variety give the film a positive review and wrote: 

Andrew Murray from The Upcoming give the film 3 out of 5 rating and he wrote:

References

External links
 
 

2021 horror films
2020s English-language films
2020s teen horror films
Amazon Studios films
American supernatural horror films
American vampire films
Blumhouse Productions films
Films set in New Orleans
Films shot in New Orleans
Teen adventure films
2020s American films